Temple Israel of the City of New York is a Reform congregation in Manhattan. It was incorporated in 1873 by German Jews.

It purchased its first synagogue building Fifth Avenue and 125th Street in 1887, constructed its own at 201 Lenox Avenue and 120th Street in 1907, and constructed another at 210 West 91st Street in 1920. Its current Brutalist style building, at 112 East 75th Street on the Upper East Side, was completed in 1967.

Since its founding, Temple Israel has been served by only five senior rabbis: Maurice H. Harris (1882–1930), William Rosenblum (1930–1963), Martin Zion (1963–1991), Judith Lewis (1991–2006), and David Gelfand since 2006.

Early history
Temple Israel was incorporated in 1873 as Yod b'Yod ("Hand in Hand") congregation (formally Congregation Hand in Hand of Harlem), the first synagogue in Harlem. The founders were German Jews, typically shopkeepers, traditionally observant, and first worshiped above a printing shop on East 125th Street in Harlem. An early trustee was Cyrus L. Sulzberger, father of New York Times publisher Arthur Hays Sulzberger. They soon established a Hebrew school called "Gates of Learning" for the 45 children of the congregation. The congregation rented a larger space on 124th Street in 1874, and in 1876 leased a former church on 116th Street, between First Avenue and Second Avenue. In 1880, the congregation purchased the building on 116th Street.

Temple Israel was initially lay-led, but in 1882 appointed Maurice H. Harris as the congregation's rabbi; at the time, he was still a student at Columbia College, Columbia University, and at Emanu-El Theological Seminary. That year, the congregation changed its name to Temple Israel of Harlem (though the name change wasn't formally legalized until 1894). In 1884, Harris' installation was made official.

First buildings

In 1887, the congregation purchased a building at Fifth Avenue and 125th Street, and the following year re-dedicated it as their synagogue.
Designed by John W. Welch, the building had been formerly owned by the Holy Trinity Church, and was constructed in 1869–1870. In 1888 the congregation also re-organized, changing its name to Temple Israel of Harlem. In 1898, the congregation celebrated its 25-year anniversary and 10 years in its current home.

The congregation constructed its own synagogue building at 201 Lenox Avenue, at 120th Street, in 1907. The limestone building was not designed in the typical Moorish Revival style of other synagogues of the time; the designer, Arnold Brunner, argued that "synagogues have no traditional lines of architectural expression". According to David W. Dunlap, the building "looks like a Roman temple until you notice the Stars of David in the column capitals, fanlights, and spandrel panels", and "may rank as the single best Neoclassical synagogue in Manhattan". Temple Israel joined the Union of American Hebrew Congregations (now Union for Reform Judaism) in 1909, and a few years later merged with Shaarey Borocho (or Shaaray Beracha), a synagogue of Alsatian Jews.

During World War I, the loyalties of the still mostly German-Jewish members were, at first, divided between the Central Powers and the Allied Powers, though Harris supported the Allies.

Moves to West 91st Street and East 75th Street
In 1920, the members moved to a new Neoclassical building at 210 West 91st Street, designed by William Tachau; the old building on Lenox Avenue was sold to the Seventh-Day Adventist Temple, which in turn sold it in 1925 to the Mount Olivet Baptist Church. Temple Israel elected its first woman trustee in 1921, dedicated its new building in 1922, and in 1924 officially changed its name to Temple Israel of the City of New York. By 1929, membership exceeded 950.

William Franklin Rosenblum succeeded Harris as Temple Israel's second rabbi in 1930, and Harris died just a few months later that year. The congregation was active during the Great Depression, and supported Jewish education programs for poor children of the neighborhood. Temple Israel actively supported the war effort during World War II, and afterward Rosenblum opposed the creation of Israel, though he would later become a supporter of the country.

Rosenblum retired in 1963, and Martin Zion succeeded him that year as Temple Israel's third rabbi. At the time, the congregation's trustees had decided to relocate the synagogue from the Upper West Side to the Upper East Side of Manhattan, and in 1964 began construction of a new building at Temple Israel's current location, 112 East 75th Street. Designed by architect Peter Claman of Schuman & Lichtenstein, the Brutalist structure was completed in 1967. The previous building on West 91st Street was sold to the Young Israel of the West Side congregation, who still occupy it.

Events since 1980
Robert Abelson became leader of the congregation's music program in 1980. In 1985, Judith Lewis became Temple Israel's Director of Education, and in 1991 she succeeded Zion as the synagogue's fourth senior rabbi. By 1995, membership was over four hundred families.

In 2006 David Gelfand succeeded Lewis, becoming Temple Israel's fifth Senior Rabbi in 2006, after an acrimonious departure from the Jewish Center of the Hamptons. Gelfand had previously served as rabbi in Temple Beth-El in Great Neck, New York; Har Sinai Temple in Pennington, New Jersey; and the Fairmount Temple in Beachwood, Ohio. He helped found and served as a national officer of the Interfaith Alliance, and is a member of the National Council of the American Israel Public Affairs Committee.

Irena Altshul joined Temple Israel in 2003, left in 2006, and rejoined as cantor in 2013. Melissa Buyer-Wittman joined the synagogue as Director of Lifelong Learning in 2011, and David Reinhart became Assistant Rabbi in 2019.

See also
List of synagogues named Temple Israel

Notes

References

Temple Israel website:

External links

Temple Israel, New York City Chapter of the American Guild of Organists website
For more on Temple Israel during Willam Rosenblum's tenure as rabbi (1930–1963), see his rabbinical career materials in the William F. Rosenblum Papers.; P-327; American Jewish Historical Society, Boston, MA and New York, NY.

Brutalist synagogues
German-Jewish culture in New York City
Neoclassical synagogues
Reform synagogues in New York City
Religious organizations established in 1873
Synagogues completed in 1907
Synagogues completed in 1922
Synagogues completed in 1967
Synagogues in Manhattan
Upper East Side
Brutalist architecture in New York City